Ravi Kiran (born 1 February 1991) is an Indian cricketer who plays for Hyderabad.

He along with Ashish Reddy, he holds the record 10th-wicket partnership in List A cricket, with 128 runs. He was the leading wicket-taker for Hyderabad in the 2017–18 Ranji Trophy, with 16 dismissals in four matches.

References

External links
 

1991 births
Living people
Indian cricketers
Hyderabad cricketers
Cricketers from Hyderabad, India